King Edward VI School, Morpeth is a voluntary controlled academy high school in Morpeth, Northumberland, England. It was established by a royal charter as Morpeth Grammar School and later as King Edward VI Grammar School. The school became a comprehensive school in the 1970s and an academy in December 2011. It is locally known as "KEVI" or simply "King Edward's". In 2011, the school became part of The Three Rivers Learning Trust.

History
The school was originally founded as a chantry school in the early 14th century and was located in the Morpeth Chantry. The school was refounded in 1552 as the Free Grammar School of King Edward the Sixth, being commonly referred to as the Morpeth Grammar School by locals. The reopening of the school is frequently associated with William Turner (c. 1508–1568), a nonconformist divine. He is known as the "Father of English Botany", was a native of Morpeth, and is believed to have attended the grammar school before attending Cambridge University and later to have returned to be its headmaster.

Morpeth Grammar School was the plaintiff in a lawsuit of the longest duration in English legal history. The case started in 1710 and concerned the recovery of lands granted to the school by Edward VI and later leased to the Thornton family. The case was reopened in 1833, advanced in 1847, and determined in 1870. By the 1940s the school was known as King Edward VI Grammar School.

The school lost its status as a grammar school in the educational reforms of the 1970s and became a comprehensive. A new school building was opened in 1967 to accommodate the boys' and girls' grammar schools, although they remained segregated until the new educational reforms took effect.

Present day 
The King Edward VI School was awarded Beacon School status in 2003, and Leading Edge status in 2004. The school officially gained academy status on 1 December 2011. The current building was constructed in 1967. The school was one of the first few schools to have two specialisms.

Management
The headteacher is Clare Savage.

The Chair of the Board of Directors is Paul Carvin.

Ofsted 
As of 2020, the school's most recent Ofsted report was in 2014, when the school was judged as outstanding in all five categories.

Exam results
In 2016, Year 11 students achieved excellent GCSE results, the best in Northumberland. Eighty per cent of students achieved five or more passes at Grades A*–C, with 80 per cent gaining five or more including English and Maths, which was the highest percentage in Northumberland. Over 250 students from Year 11 have now moved into the 6th Form at King Edwards.
In the same year, A Level students at the King Edward VI School produced excellent results. There was an increase in the percentage of A*–B grades to 53 per cent, an improvement of 5 per cent over the previous year. The overall A*–E pass rate increased to 99 per cent. The average points score per student came out at 838.9, which was the highest of any school in Northumberland.

Observatory
In 2014, students from the school's space club, KEVISA (KEVI Space Agency), designed and built an astronomical observatory on the school's former dry ski slope, securing funding from several sources. Housing an 11-inch telescope, the observatory is used for enrichment activities involving students, and events throughout the year where members of the public can learn about astronomy.

Music department
The school music department hosts many music clubs, including three choirs, a jazz band, steel band, ceilidh band and full community orchestra formed of students, parents and other local musicians. The department also produces biennial school musicals. The department has a number of practice rooms, an Apple Mac computer classroom, recording studio and rehearsal room.

Year 9 commemoration service
The school stands at the top of Cottingwood Lane and, in a long-standing tradition, all Year 9 students take part in a commemoration service in St James's Church which sits at the bottom of the lane. It is intended to give students a short history of the school and introduce them to the school's values and ideals. The service consists of a number of short readings from staff and students, accompanied by songs from the school choir.

School arms
The school arms are: Argent masoned gules, a tower triple-turreted within a bordure of the second charged with eight martlets of the first.

Notable former pupils
 John Smith Purdy (1872–1936), soldier and physician
 Alan Raitt (1930–2006), Professor of French Literature at the University of Oxford
 Sid Waddell (1940–2012), darts commentator
 Alex Banfield (1990- ), concert and operatic tenor
 Jack Clark (1994- ), cricketer

References

Sources
 The King Edward VI School website
 DES website: The King Edward VI School, Morpeth
 Schoolsfinder Direct (UK Government) website: school profile 2006
 BBC: Secondary schools league tables: The King Edward VI School, Morpeth
 Morpeth Chantry Conservation Management Plan (includes historical detail on the buildings and the school)
 Morpeth Bagpipe Museum: Chantry building
 KEVI Steel Pans Website

1552 establishments in England
Academies in Northumberland
Educational institutions established in the 1550s
Upper schools in Northumberland
Schools with a royal charter
Morpeth, Northumberland
King Edward VI Schools